Rottnest Island lies  west of the coastline of Perth, Western Australia; it is  at its widest and  at its longest.

Coastline features
Bays, points, reefs and smaller islands along this coastline are extensively named.

Topography
The named hills of Rottnest are Wadjemup Hill, Oliver Hill, Radar Hill and Mount Herschel.

Named coastal features

 Abraham Point
 Armstrong Rock
 Army Jetty
 Basin (usually known as The Basin)
 Bathurst Point – location of the Bathurst Lighthouse
 Bickley Bay – just south of Kingstown Barracks
 Bickley Point
 Cape Vlamingh – also known as West End
 Cathedral Rocks – north west of West End
 Catherine Bay
 City of York Bay – west of Little Armstrong Bay
 Crayfish Rocks
 Duck Rock
 Dyer Island
 Eagle Bay – at the West End
 Fairbridge Bluff
 Fay's Bay
 Fish Hook Bay
 Green Island
 Henrietta Rocks
 Kingstown
 Little Armstrong Bay
 Little Parakeet Bay
 Little Salmon Bay
 Longreach Bay – between the Basin and Geordie Bay
 Mabel Cove
 Marjorie Bay
 Mary Cove
 Mushroom Rock
 Nancy Cove – narrowest part of Island
 Narrow Neck
 North Point
 Parakeet Bay
 Parker Point – southernmost point
 Phillip Point
 Phillip Rocks
 Pinky Beach
 Porpoise Bay
 Radar Reef – at West End
 Ricey Beach
 Rocky Bay
 Salmon Bay
 Salmon Point
 South Point
 Stark Bay
 Strickland Bay 
 Thomson Bay
 Vera Rocks
 Wallace Island
 West End
 Wilson Bay

Named lakes

 Garden Lake
 Geordie Bay
 Government House Lake
 Lake Baghdad
 Lake Herschel/ Herschel Lake
 Lake Negri
 Lake Sirius
 Lake Timperley
 Lake Vincent
 Pearse Lake
 Serpentine Lake

Wells and bores
The island is very limited in water supply and considerable numbers of bores have been sunk to keep water supply available.

In 1976, Philip Playford's Geological Map of Rottnest identified wells, abandoned wells, and bores on the island.  The following is only a select list of the full range.

West end
 Radar Hill just east of Cape Vlaming had Radar Station Well and was designated "abandoned".

South coast
 Parker Point between Salmon Bay And Porpoise Bay, had Parker Point Bores as "abandoned", closer to Tree Hill the well and bore were active.

See also 
Rottnest Island shipwrecks — details on the twelve larger shipwrecks in close proximity to the island
Colonial buildings of Rottnest Island
 Islands of Perth, Western Australia

Notes

External links 
 Rottnest Island Authority home page

Landmarks in Perth, Western Australia
Rottnest Island